European Universities Football Championships were first organised in 2003, they have been organised annually since.

The European Universities Football Championships are coordinated by the European University Sports Association along with the 18 other sports on the program of the European universities championships.

Overview

Futsal
http://old.futsalplanet.com/agenda/agenda-01.asp?id=20744

http://old.futsalplanet.com/agenda/agenda-01.asp?id=19492

European Universities Futsal Championships

European Universities Futsal Championships - Men History:

00-00/00/2020 Belgrade (SRB)*

00-00/00/2019 Braga (POR)

00-00/00/2018 Coimbra (POR)*

10-17/07/2017 Corum (TUR) - University of Beira Interior (POR)

17-24/07/2016 Zagreb (CRO) - University of Zagreb (CRO)*

02-09/08/2015 Poznan (POL) - VERN (CRO)

23-29/07/2014 Rotterdam (NED) - University of Paris (FRA)*

21-28/07/2013 Malaga (ESP) - University of Valladolid (ESP)

16-22/07/2012 Cordoba (ESP) - Siberian FU, Krasnoyarsk (RUS)*

17-24/07/2011 Tampere (FIN) - University of Valencia (ESP)

18-25/07/2010 Zagreb (CRO) - University of Zagreb (CRO)

18-26/07/2009 Podgorica (MNE) - University of Malaga (ESP)

14-19/07/2008 Wroclaw (POL) - University of Malaga (ESP)

23-29/07/2007 Izola (SVN) - Dniepropetrovsk SFA (UKR)

18-23/07/2006 Novi Sad (SRB) - University of Ljubljana (SVN)

17-24/07/2005 Latina (ITA) - University of Novi Sad (SCG)

19-24/09/2004 Paralimni (CYP) - University of Novi Sad (SCG)

European Universities Futsal Championships - Women History:

00-00/00/2020 Belgrade (SRB)*

00-00/00/2019 Braga (POR)

00-00/00/2018 Coimbra (POR)*

10-17/07/2017 Corum (TUR) - Moscow Polytechnical Uni. (RUS)

18-24/07/2016 Zagreb (CRO) - Moscow State Uni. of ME (RUS)*

02-09/08/2015 Poznan (POL) - Rouen University (FRA)

23-29/07/2014 Rotterdam (NED) - University of Alicante (ESP)*

21-28/07/2013 Malaga (ESP) - University of AS Rouen UC SSE (FRA)

16-22/07/2012 Cordoba (ESP) - Moscow State TU Mami (RUS)*

17-23/07/2011 Tampere (FIN) - SSHPE Konin (POL)

18-25/07/2010 Zagreb (CRO) - University of Coimbra (POR)

 European Universities Games - Futsal Tournament

External links 
 EUSA official website

References
 

http://old.futsalplanet.com/agenda/agenda-01.asp?id=19477

football
International association football competitions in Europe